Studio City is the second album by Electric Company, released on March 10, 1998, on Island Records.

Track listing

Personnel 
Kenneth James Gibson – keyboards on "Darken An' Slobbering", "Greenland" and "Born Algebra Skinned"
Peter Grant – illustrations, design
Brad Laner – instruments, production, engineering, mixing, recording
Brian Rosser – guitar on "Arbor Sirens"

References

External links 
 

1998 albums
Electric Company (band) albums
Island Records albums